SQA may refer to:

 Scottish Qualifications Authority, accrediting educational awards
 Software quality assurance
 Society of Quality Assurance
 Santa Ynez Airport, California, US, IATA code
 Shama language (ISO 639-3 code sqa), a Kainji language of Nigeria
 South Queensland Academy, a former Japanese school in Australia
 Sugar Quota Administration, later Sugar Regulatory Administration, Philippines
 Status quo ante (disambiguation)